Konstantin Kotov can mean:
 Konstantin Kotov (footballer) (born 1998), Russian footballer
 Konstantin Kotov (activist) (born 1985), Russian political activist